The Olympic Aquatics Stadium was a temporary aquatics center in the Barra Olympic Park in Rio de Janeiro. The venue hosted the swimming events, Synchronized swimming finals and water polo finals at the 2016 Summer Olympics, and the para-swimming events for the 2016 Summer Paralympics.

Structure
The center was designed as a temporary structure, a form of nomadic architecture similar to the Future Arena, which hosted handball. After completion of the two Games, it was dismantled and its parts were used in the construction of two new, different facilities.

The exterior of the building featured art by Brazilian artist Adriana Varejão.

References

External links

Rio2016.org.br bid package. Volume 2. p. 56.
Sports and venues of the 2016 Summer Olympics
Olympic Aquatics Stadium

Swimming venues in Brazil
Sports venues in Rio de Janeiro (city)
Sports venues completed in 2016
Sports venues demolished in 2016
Venues of the 2016 Summer Olympics
Olympic swimming venues
Olympic synchronized swimming venues
Defunct sports venues in Brazil
Barra Olympic Park